Gilbert Hipke (July 12, 1898 – September 13, 1977) was a member of the Wisconsin State Assembly.

Biography
Hipke was born on July 12, 1898, in New Holstein, Wisconsin. During World War I, he served as a sergeant in the United States Army. He was a member of the American Legion. On September 14, 1921, Hipke married Brunette Groetzinger. They had three children. He died on September 13, 1977, in Madison, Wisconsin.

Political career
Hipke was elected to the Assembly in 1958 and re-elected in 1960 as a Republican. He had previously been an unsuccessful candidate as an Independent Republican in 1956. Additionally, he was a New Holstein alderman and a member of the Calumet County, Wisconsin Board.

References

People from New Holstein, Wisconsin
Wisconsin city council members
Military personnel from Wisconsin
United States Army personnel of World War I
1898 births
1977 deaths
20th-century American politicians
Republican Party members of the Wisconsin State Assembly